are a Norwegian gammaldans ensemble which comes from Lom in Gudbrandsdalen.

Crew

Members 
 (1976-) Bjørn Turtum - accordion
 (1986-) Stig Rune Byrøygard - accordion
 (2010-) Ole Foss - violin
 (1988-) Kolbein Kjørren - guitar
 (2010-) Arne Stasviken - bass guitar

Earlier members 
 Ole Kristian Gråv - violin
 Asbjørn Stensrud - violin
 Tor Arne Sandviken - bass guitar

Discography 
Nytt frå bygdom (1994)
På bukkeball (2007)

Achievements 
1993 Gold at "Landsfestivalen i Gamaldansmusikk", Stryn
''1999 Silver at "Landsfestivalen i Gamaldansmusikk", Geilo

Norwegian folk musical groups
Norwegian dance music groups
Musical groups from Oppland
Lom, Norway
Musical groups with year of establishment missing